During the 2009–10 Dutch football season, PSV Eindhoven competed in the Eredivisie.

Season summary
PSV finished the league campaign in third place, one spot higher than the previous season. This finish was enough to secure a spot in the play-off round of the 2010–11 UEFA Europa League.

Competitions

Eredivisie

League table

KNVB Cup

UEFA Europa League

Qualifying rounds

Group stage

Round of 32

Kit
Philips continued their sponsorship of PSV's kits, as did Nike for PSV's kit manufacturing.

Players

First-team squad
Squad at end of season

Left club during season

Jong PSV

References

Notes

PSV Eindhoven seasons
PSV Eindhoven